Nijel Christian Pack (born May 22, 2001) is an American college basketball player for the Miami Hurricanes of the Atlantic Coast Conference (ACC). He previously played for the Kansas State Wildcats.

High school career
Pack played basketball for Lawrence Central High School in Indianapolis, Indiana. As a junior, he averaged 16.5 points and 4.1 assists, leading his team to a 22–4 record and a Class 4A sectional title. In his senior season, Pack averaged 17.7 points, 4.2 assists and four rebounds per game, and helped his team achieve a 22–3 record. He competed for the Indy Heat at the Nike Elite Youth Basketball League. He committed to playing college basketball for Kansas State over offers from Butler, Loyola (Illinois) and Nevada, among others.

College career
On January 30, 2021, Pack posted a freshman season-high 26 points, five assists and three steals in a 68–61 loss to Texas A&M. He shot 8-of-14 from the three-point line, setting the program single-game record for three-pointers made by a freshman. Pack missed four games due to COVID-19 protocol and a fifth game because of an eye infection. As a freshman, Pack averaged 12.7 points, 3.8 assists and 3.7 rebounds per game. On January 22, 2022, he scored a career-high 35 points in a 78–75 loss against Kansas. He was named to the First Team All-Big 12 as a sophomore as well as Most Improved Player. Pack averaged 17.4 points, 3.8 rebounds and 2.2 assists per game. Following the season, he declared for the 2022 NBA draft and entered the transfer portal.

On April 23, 2022, Pack transferred to Miami (Florida).

Career statistics

College

|-
| style="text-align:left;"| 2020–21
| style="text-align:left;"| Kansas State
| 24 || 24 || 33.5 || .418 || .405 || .794 || 3.7 || 3.8 || 1.2 || .0 || 12.7
|-
| style="text-align:left;"| 2021–22
| style="text-align:left;"| Kansas State
| 29 || 28 || 33.1 || .455 || .436 || .845 || 3.8 || 2.2 || 1.3 || .1 || 17.4
|- class="sortbottom"
| style="text-align:center;" colspan="2"| Career
| 53 || 52 || 33.3 || .440 || .423 || .829 || 3.7 || 2.9 || 1.3 || .1 || 15.3

References

External links
Kansas State Wildcats bio

2001 births
Living people
American men's basketball players
Basketball players from Indianapolis
Basketball players from Wisconsin
Kansas State Wildcats men's basketball players
Miami Hurricanes men's basketball players
People from Oconomowoc, Wisconsin
Point guards